Leonardo Guidi (born 20 March 1974) is an Italian racing cyclist. He rode in the 1998 Tour de France.

References

External links
 

1974 births
Living people
Italian male cyclists
Place of birth missing (living people)
People from Pontedera
Sportspeople from the Province of Pisa
Cyclists from Tuscany